The Confederate War Memorial is a memorial to Confederate soldiers located behind the Common Pleas Courthouse in Cape Girardeau, Missouri. It was erected by the Cape Girardeau United Daughters of the Confederacy in 1931. It was moved to its current location in 1995. Beside it is a fountain and statue erected in 1911 by the Women's Relief Corps. This latter Union monument is dedicated "[i]n memory of the soldiers of the Civil War."

(Confederate States of America), and the years 1861–1865.

On October 10, 2011, the Confederate monument was vandalized with spray paint.

In the summer of 2020 during the height of the Black Lives Matter movement, Cape Girardeau's mayor Bob Fox asked the Cape Girardeau Historic Preservation Commission for advice on what to do with the memorial, as many people had submitted petitions for and against the structure's removal. On June 23, 2020, the Commission unanimously voted to remove and store the monument. On July 6, 2020, the Cape Girardeau City Council unanimously voted to remove the memorial and place it in storage until a suitable place could be found for its relocation. Some city councilors suggested Old Lorimier Cemetery as a possibility, as up to 1200 Confederate and Union soldiers are buried there.

References

1931 sculptures
Confederate States of America monuments and memorials in Missouri
Buildings and structures in Cape Girardeau, Missouri
Outdoor sculptures in Missouri
United Daughters of the Confederacy monuments and memorials
Vandalized works of art in Missouri